Roseaplagis caelatus is a species of small sea snail in the family Trochidae, the top shells.

Description
It is smaller than Cantharidus sanguineus (height: 5.5 mm, diameter 4.5 mm) but it is more deeply ribbed and its grooves are wider.
The imperforate shell is more deeply ribbed, and the ribs narrower. They number 5 to 7 on the penultimate whorl, 15 to 16 on the body whorl. Sometimes they are obsoletely granose through being crossed by growth lines. The columella shows a slight swelling in the middle.

Distribution
This marine species is endemic to New Zealand and occurs off the Foveaux Straits; Port Pegasus, Stewart Island; Snares and Bounty Islands

Subspecies
The former subspecies have been named:
 Micrelenchus caelatus archibenthicola Dell, 1956: synonym of Cantharidus caelatus mortenseni Powell, 1933; synonym of Roseaplagis mortenseni (Odhner, 1924)
 Micrelenchus caelatus bakeri Fleming, 1948: synonym of Roseaplagis artizona A. Adams, 1853 (Odhner, N.H.J., 1924)
 Micrelenchus caelatus elongatus (Suter, 1897): synonym of Cantharidus caelatus elongatus (Suter, 1897); synonym of Roseaplagis artizona A. Adams, 1853
 Micrelenchus caelatus morioria Powell, 1933: synonym of Cantharidus caelatus mortenseni Powell, 1933; synonym of Roseaplagis mortenseni (Odhner, 1924)
 Micrelenchus caelatus mortenseni (Odhner, 1924): synonym of Roseaplagis mortenseni (Odhner, 1924)

References

 F.W. Hutton, Revision of the recent rhipidoglossate and docoglossate Mollusca of New Zealand; Proceedings of the Linnean Society of New South Wales, ser. 1 v. 9 (1884)
 Powell A. W. B., New Zealand Mollusca, William Collins Publishers Ltd, Auckland, New Zealand 1979 
 Marshall B.A. 1998. The New Zealand Recent species of Cantharidus Montfort, 1810 and Micrelenchus Finlay, 1926 (Mollusca: Gastropoda: Trochidae). Molluscan Research 19(1): 107-156

caelatus
Gastropods of New Zealand
Gastropods described in 1884